Gara is a Hindustani classical raga belonging to the Khamaj Thaat. This raga is similar to raga Jaijaiwanti. Both ragas i.e. raga Jaijaiwanti and raga Gara, have the same svaras. Gara is a rare raga. It is rendered in the late evening. The raga uses all the seven notes, six in the ascent and seven in the descent. Therefore the Jati of the raga is Shaadav-Sampurna. While some say that seven svaras are played in the ascent and seven in the descent. Therefore the Jati then becomes Sampurna-Sampurna. It uses both, the Komal (flat) and Shuddha (full) Nishad, and all other notes are Shuddha (full). The derivative ragas out of this structure are grouped under the broad head of Khamaj Thaat. Gara belongs to a family of melodic entities, which were apparently derived from folk melodies, and entered art-music in association with the thumri genre. This family includes ragas like Kafi, Piloo, Jangula, Barwa, and Zilla, along with several others. This raga expresses the feeling of happiness and satisfaction of achievement, however it simultaneously conveys the sadness of losing. This raga is also a vivacious and romantic one.

Composition
Raga Jaijaiwanti bears the closest resemblance to Gara. However, some also believe that raga Gara is a combination of Khamaj, Piloo and Jhinjhoti. The raga belongs to the Khamaj parent scale, and is characterised by a notional scale-base at Pa of the lower octave, rather than the customary Sa. Sometimes it is considered to be in the Kafi parent scale too.
The types of raga Gara can be separated by one, the bright Gara (which gravitates more towards Khamaj thaat and maybe a little into the Bilaval Thaat) from the more somber Gara which is the other type, which gets more into Kafi thaat and even Piloo-ang. Raga Gara can also be influenced by certain ragas like, raga Maand or even raga Bhinna Shadja, raga Pancham se Gara, raga Pahadi, raga Piloo, raga Sindura, raga Zilla and raga Manjh Khamaj in terms of playing Thumris or Bhajans (Semi-classical music). But this doesn't include the Raga Vistar (aalap) or Khyal Gayaki (Classical music) because a ragas original composition and structure doesn't change in the raga vistar. This factor may change in the semi-classical forms of any raga.

Aarohana

S G (komal) m P D N S 

Avaroha

S N D P m G (komal) S

Pakad / Chalan

R g R S D n P D N S G (komal) M R g R 

Vadi

Ga

Samavadi

Ni

Songs in Raga Gara

(The references of all songs that are given below are - )

 Aise To Na Dekho
 Film - Teen Deviyan
 Year - 1965
 Raga - Gara
 Tala - Dadra
 Music Director - S. D. Burman
 Singer - Mohd. Rafi
 Video link - https://www.youtube.com/watch?v=OaginwwacJI

 
 Diwana Kahe Ke Aaj Mujhe Phir Pukariye
 Film - Mulzim
 Year -1963
 Raga - Gara
 Tala - Dadra
 Music Director - Ravi
 Singer - Mohd. Rafi
 Video link - https://www.youtube.com/watch?v=TDuQcRX6hXg

 
 Hamsafar Saath Apna Chhod Chale
 Film - Aakhri Daao
 Year -1958
 Raga - Gara
 Tala - Dadra
 Music Director - Madan Mohan
 Singer - Mohd. Rafi, Asha Bhosle
 Video link - https://www.youtube.com/watch?v=OIZaLYIfPXg

 
 Tere Mere Sapne Ab Ek Rang Hain
 Film - Guide
 Year - 1965
 Raga - Gara
 Tala - Dadra
 Music Director - S.D. Burman
 Singer - Mohd. Rafi
 Video link - https://www.youtube.com/watch?v=ngch5NKgPh8

 
 Jivan Mein Piya Tera Sath Rahe
 Film - Gunj Uthi Shehnai
 Year - 1959
 Raga - Gara
 Tala - Kaherava
 Music Director - Vasant Desai
 Singers - Lata Mangeshkar, Mohd. Rafi
 Video link - https://www.youtube.com/watch?v=10c6TeWZmVE

 
 Kabhi Khud Pe Kabhi Haalaath Pe Ronaa Aayaa
 Film - Hum Dono
 Year - 1961
 Raga - Gara
 Tala - Dadra
 Music Director - Jaidev
 Singer - Mohd. Rafi
 Video link - https://www.youtube.com/watch?v=CzpHlGxDzqE

 
 Mohe Panghat Pe Nandalal Ched Gayo Re
 Film - Mughal-e-Azam
 Year - 1960
 Raga - Gara
 Tala - Dadra
 Music Director - Naushad
 Singer - Lata Mangeshkar
 Video link - https://www.youtube.com/watch?v=H4y8tXUlJjA

 Unnai Kaanadhu naan
 Language - Tamil
 Movie    - Vishwaroopam
 Raga     - Gara
 Year     - 2013
 Composer - Shankar-Ehsaan-Loy
  Vocal   - Shankar Mahadevan & Kamal Haasan

 Raghupati Raghava Raja Ram
 Raga - Gara
 Composer - Tulsidas or Ramdas
 Tuned by - Vishnu Digambar Paluskar
 Popularised by Mahatma Gandhi

  Chanthu Thottile
  Film     - Banaras
  Language - Malayalam 
  Year     - 2009
  Raga     - Mishra Gara
            with touches of Malhar
  Composer - M Jayachandran
  Lyricist - Gireesh Puttenchery
  Vocal    - Shreya Ghoshal

See also
 Jaijaiwanti
 Piloo
 Khamaj
 Jhinjhoti

References 

Hindustani music